Jean-François Leuba (16 July 1934 – 22 October 2004) was a Swiss lawyer and jurist. He belonged to the Liberal Party of Switzerland and served as President of the National Council of Switzerland in 1995/1996.

External links

Members of the National Council (Switzerland)
Presidents of the National Council (Switzerland)
People from Lausanne
1934 births
2004 deaths